Skeleton Creek is a watercourse in Queensland, Australia. It is near Woree and White Rock in the south suburbs of Cairns.

References 

Geography of Queensland
Rivers of Queensland